Gebhard Gritsch (born 21 December 1956) is an Austrian sports coach and consultant, and from 2009 to 2017, fitness coach and consultant to the Serbian tennis professional Novak Djokovic.  Gritsch studied Sports Science and Sports Management at the universities of Innsbruck and Vienna and obtained his master's degree in 1985.  In 1994, Gritsch earned his PhD from the University of Vienna, with his sports science based dissertation Handbook for player development: From the talented junior to the tennis professional.

Career
Gritsch has over 20 years experience in tennis player development, including as national coach in the Philippines and Indonesia. In New Zealand, he worked as head coach for the Central Region, and as consultant to the New Zealand Academy of Sports.

Recognised as one of the best fitness coaches in the world
 Gritsch contributed to the success of Novak Djokovic’s professional career, including through providing sports scientific based training and a balanced, holistic performance management approach to both training and competition.

Gebhard Gritsch provides sports planning expertise to training centres, sports federations and governmental sports organizations.

References

External links
 Gebhard Gritsch official site

Living people
1956 births
Austrian tennis coaches
Austrian sports coaches
University of Vienna alumni
Novak Djokovic coaches